Wagdi is a Bhil language of India spoken mainly in Dungarpur and Banswara districts of Southern Rajasthan. Wagdi has been characterized as a dialect of Bhili.

There are four dialects of Wagdi: Aspur, Kherwara, Sagwara and Adivasi Wagdi.

Grammar

Nouns
There are two numbers: singular and plural.
Two genders: masculine and feminine.
Three cases: simple, oblique, and vocative.  Case marking is partly inflectional and partly postpositional.
Nouns are declined according to their final segments.
All pronouns are inflected for number and case but gender is distinguished only in the third person singular pronouns.
The third person pronouns are distinguished on the proximity/remoteness dimension in each gender.
Adjectives are of two types: either ending in /-o/ or not.
Cardinal numbers up to ten are inflected.
Both present and past participles function as adjectives.

Verbs
There are three tenses and four moods.

Sources

Languages of India
Western Indo-Aryan languages
Indo-Aryan languages
Bhil